Barbara Lang (born April 8, 1937) is an American actress who has been featured in many Broadway productions of the 1960s and 1970s.

Discography
She featured in the Anything Goes 1962 Broadway Revival Cast and soundtrack album. as well as the 1973 A Little Night Music- Original Broadway Cast Recording 1973.

References

American actresses
Living people
1937 births
21st-century American women